The 1960 Oakland Raiders season was the inaugural one for the franchise and for the American Football League (AFL). Head coach Eddie Erdelatz led the team to a 6–8 finish, third in the four-team Western Division.

Offseason 
The Raiders were the last of the AFL's original eight teams to be accepted into the new league. As a result of the Minnesota franchise's defection to the NFL, Oakland was awarded the eighth AFL franchise on January 30, 1960. It was not until February 9 that the team named its first head coach, Eddie Erdelatz, who had success as head coach of the United States Naval Academy during the 1950s.

When the University of California refused to let the Raiders play home games at Memorial Stadium in Berkeley, they chose Kezar Stadium (also home to the NFL's 49ers) in San Francisco as their home field.

1960 AFL draft 
The Raiders inherited the draft picks of the Minneapolis franchise.

Team leaders 
Passing
Tom Flores – 1,738 yds., 12 TD, 12 INT, 71.8 rating
Rushing
Tony Teresa – 139 att., 608 yds., 6 TD
Receiving
Billy Lott – 49 rec., 524 yds., 1 TD

Regular season 
Over the course of a fourteen-game regular season schedule, the Raiders faced each of the other seven AFL teams twice. The AFL had no playoff rounds, only a championship game between the league's two division winners, so Oakland's third-place finish was not enough to qualify.

Season schedule

Final standings

Game summaries

Week 1: vs. Houston Oilers 

The Raiders' first-ever regular season game was played on September 11, 1960, at home against the Houston Oilers. The Oilers took an early lead after a 43-yard pass from George Blanda to Charlie Hennigan. The Raiders evened the score in the second quarter when Tom Flores connected with Tony Teresa for a 13-yard pass. Oakland took the lead after Ed Macon intercepted a Blanda pass and ran 42 yards for a touchdown, but the Oilers scored 23 points to take a 30–15 lead. Flores found Jack Larscheid for a 46-yard scoring pass in the fourth quarter, but it was not nearly enough.

Week 2: vs. Dallas Texans 

The Raiders lost their second consecutive game in a Friday night matchup against Hank Stram's Dallas Texans. The Texans jumped out to an early 10–0 lead after a field goal and a touchdown pass from Cotton Davidson to Max Boydston. Oakland responded with 26-yard touchdown pass from Babe Parilli to Tony Teresa. The Texans' Jack Spikes ran for a 15-yard score in the second quarter, and Oakland responded with a field goal. After scoring a third-quarter field goal, Dallas pulled away with two touchdowns (rushing and receiving) from Johnny Robinson.

Week 3: at Houston Oilers 

Oakland recorded its first-ever victory in a Week 3 rematch against the eventual league champion Oilers. J.D. Smith ran for a 3-yard score to post the Raiders to an early 7–0 lead. The Oilers tied and then overtook the Raiders on the strength of a touchdown pass and two field goals by George Blanda. In the final period, Tom Flores found tight end Gene Prebola for a 14-yard touchdown, which was enough for the win.

Week 4: at Denver Broncos 

In the inaugural game of what would become one of football's most intense rivalries, Frank Filchock's Denver Broncos easily defeated the Raiders on the strength of a 21-point outburst in the second quarter. Denver opened the scoring with a short first-quarter field goal, but Oakland took the lead after a 1-yard touchdown run by J.D. Smith. In the second period, a pair of touchdown strikes from Frank Tripucka to Lionel Taylor gave Denver a 17–7 lead. Bill Yelverton intercepted an Oakland pass and returned it 20 yards for a touchdown, giving Denver a 24–7 lead at halftime. A 2-yard touchdown run by Billy Lott capped the scoring for the Raiders.

Week 5: at Dallas Texans 

The Raiders improved to 2–3 in front of 21,000 at the Cotton Bowl. After a scoreless first quarter, the Texans' David Webster scored on an 80-yard interception return. The Raiders responded with three consecutive touchdowns, including a 98-yard kickoff return by James "Jetstream" Smith. Al Goldstein recorded receiving and rushing touchdowns in the third quarter. The Texans mounted a fourth-quarter comeback, but fell short when a two-point conversion attempt failed.

Week 7: at Buffalo Bills 

In Week 7, the Raiders suffered their most lopsided loss of the season and fell to 3–4. The Bills dominated thanks to four touchdown passes and a touchdown run by Johnny Green. Oakland managed just one offensive score, a 1-yard touchdown run by James "Jetstream" Smith in the second quarter. Oakland recorded the first safety in team history in the fourth quarter when a Buffalo snap went out of the end zone.

Week 8: at New York Titans 

Oakland evened their record at 4–4 in a Friday night contest against the New York Titans. The two teams combined for 35 points in the first half, including a pair of touchdown passes each from Tom Flores and the Titans' Al Dorow. New York entered the fourth quarter with a 24–14 lead, but a pair of James "Jetstream" Smith rushing touchdowns gave Oakland the narrow win.

Week 9: at Boston Patriots 

Boston avenged a Week 6 loss in a high-scoring Friday night game at Nickerson Field. Oakland's Tony Teresa ran for three touchdowns, including a pair in the fourth quarter. Quarterback Tom Flores ran for an 8-yard touchdown in the third quarter.

Week 10: vs. Buffalo Bills 

The Raiders rebounded from the previous week's defeat by holding the Bills to just one touchdown. The offensive highlight for Oakland was an 83-yard touchdown run by Tony Teresa in the third quarter.

Week 12: at Los Angeles Chargers 

After a Week 11 bye, the Raiders met Sid Gillman's Los Angeles Chargers for the first time on November 27, 1960. The eventual Western Division champion Chargers piled up 31 points by halftime, led by quarterback Jack Kemp. Kemp passed for two touchdowns in the first half, and ran for another. Oakland got short touchdown runs by J.D. Smith and Billy Lott. Tom Flores and Babe Parilli passed for touchdowns.

Week 13: vs. Los Angeles Chargers 

The Chargers continued their offensive deluge against the Raiders in Week 13, erupting for 27 points in the fourth quarter. Billy Lott ran for a touchdown in the second quarter; Charlie Hardy caught an 11-yard pass from Tom Flores in the same period.

Week 14: vs. New York Titans 

The Raiders dropped their third consecutive contest, as the Titans evened the season series. Oakland took a 28–24 lead in the fourth quarter After Tom Flores found Tony Teresa for 3-yard touchdown pass, but the Titans got the margin of victory when Al Dorow connected with Dewey Bohling for a 17-yard touchdown pass.

Week 15: vs. Denver Broncos 

On Saturday, December 17, 1960, the Raiders ended their inaugural campaign on a high note by easily defeating the Broncos. The two squads traded field goals in the first quarter, but Oakland entered halftime with a 17–10 lead on the strength of touchdown runs by Tom Flores and Tony Teresa. Denver's lone touchdown was a 6-yard pass from Frank Tripucka to Lionel Taylor in the second quarter. After that, Oakland scored 38 unanswered points, including 31 in the final period. Babe Parilli passed for two scores in his final game as a Raider.

Sources 
 1960 Oakland Raiders at databaseFootball.com

Oakland Raiders seasons
Oakland
Oakland